Summer Shade is a small unincorporated community and census-designated place (CDP) in Metcalfe County, Kentucky, United States. Originally the area was known as Sartain Precinct and later as Glover's Creek; W.M. Riggs, the postmaster, changed the name to Summer Shade in 1872.  The rural-dominated area is home to the Kingsford Charcoal factory. State highway 90, connecting Glasgow to the Dale Hollow Lake area, runs through Summer Shade. There was one school in Summer Shade that is formerly known as  Summer Shade Elementary School. It went from grades K-6. Now students go to Metcalfe County Elementary.  One of the foremost doctors in south-central Kentucky and the state during the twentieth century was Dr. C.C. Howard, who was born in Summer Shade. He worked to establish tuberculosis hospitals throughout Kentucky and to improve medical care in the rural areas of the state.

Demographics

Notable people

 Charles "Pat" Dougherty (1879-1939) Baseball pitcher in the pre-Negro leagues

Climate
The climate in this area is characterized by hot, humid summers and generally mild to cool winters.  According to the Köppen Climate Classification system, Summer Shade has a humid subtropical climate, abbreviated "Cfa" on climate maps.

References

Census-designated places in Metcalfe County, Kentucky
Unincorporated communities in Kentucky
Glasgow, Kentucky, micropolitan area
Census-designated places in Kentucky
Unincorporated communities in Metcalfe County, Kentucky